Cássio Rodrigues da Cunha Lima (Campina Grande, April 5, 1963) is a Brazilian lawyer and politician, affiliated to the Party of Brazilian Social Democracy (PSDB). He is the son of former governor of Paraíba Ronaldo Cunha Lima. He was governor of Paraiba, mayor of Campina Grande, Federal Deputy and currently is a member of the Brazilian Federal Senate.

He graduated in law from the State University of Paraíba and began his political career in 1986 when he was elected federal deputy by the state of Paraíba.

References

1963 births
Governors of Paraíba
People from Campina Grande
Living people
Brazilian Social Democracy Party politicians
Members of the Chamber of Deputies (Brazil) from Paraíba